Raleigh Downtown Live was a free summer concert series held in Raleigh, North Carolina, United States, in Moore Square Park, in the Moore Square Historic District of downtown from 2005 to 2009.  It featured many top music artists from around the world, drawing over 70,000 music fans annually. It was a joint partnership between the City of Raleigh Convention Center and Deep South Entertainment of Raleigh, North Carolina. Deep South Entertainment continues to be based in downtown Raleigh, NC, with a second office in Nashville, TN. Deep South Entertainment currently produces the Oak City 7 summer concert series in Downtown Raleigh.

Lineups
Below is a list of previous music artists that have been featured in the Raleigh Downtown Live concert series.

2010 Cancellation
Raleigh Downtown Live was cancelled for the summer of 2010, due to the opening of a new amphitheater in Raleigh, North Carolina.

References

Additional sources

External links
 Raleigh Downtown Live
 FAQs about Downtown Live
 Oak City 7 Concert Series, Downtown Raleigh

Culture of Raleigh, North Carolina
Tourist attractions in Raleigh, North Carolina